Gunārs Ķirsons (born 17 May 1951, in Omsk) is a Latvian entrepreneur, businessman and founder of the Latvian  chain of restaurants. He is also the president of the Latvian Judo Federation.

References 

1951 births
Living people
People from Omsk
20th-century Latvian businesspeople